MyFreeImplants is the largest website used by women to find donations, particularly from men, via crowdfunding for breast augmentation.

The women frequently converse with their donors.

Criticism
The site has been criticized by professional organizations including the British Association of Aesthetic Plastic Surgeons (BAAPS) for tasteless marketing and trivializing a significant surgical procedure.

It has also been criticized for providing a platform for men to ask for sexual favors.

References

External links
 

Companies based in Los Angeles
American fundraising websites
Implants (medicine)
Internet properties established in 2006
Plastic surgery